Otakar Lada (22 May 1883 – 12 July 1956) was a Bohemian fencer. He won a bronze medal in the team sabre event at the 1908 Summer Olympics.

References

1883 births
1956 deaths
Czech male fencers
Olympic fencers of Bohemia
Fencers at the 1908 Summer Olympics
Olympic bronze medalists for Bohemia
Sportspeople from Prague
Olympic medalists in fencing
Medalists at the 1908 Summer Olympics
Sportspeople from the Austro-Hungarian Empire